Richard, Rick, Ricky, or Dick Ross may refer to:
 Richard J. Ross, Massachusetts State Senator
 Richard Ross (photographer), American photographer
 Richard S. Ross (1924–2015), American cardiologist
 Rick Ross (William Leonard Roberts II, born 1976), American rapper
 Rick Alan Ross (born 1952), consultant and founder of the Cult Education Institute
 "Freeway" Rick Ross (born 1960), also known as Ricky Ross, American drug trafficker
 Ricky Ross (musician) (born 1957), Scottish musician singer-songwriter known for his work with the rock band Deacon Blue
 Richie Ross (born 1982), American football player
 Richard P. Ross Jr. (1906–1990), United States Marine Corps general
 Richard Ross (basketball) (born 1992), American basketball player
 Richard C. Ross (1927–2012), American politician in the New York State Assembly
 Dick Ross, American baseball player

See also
 Jack Ross (footballer, born 1911) (1911–1996), real name Richard Ross
 Richard Younger-Ross (born 1953), English politician
 Richard Ross Museum of Art, Delaware, Ohio, United States